Anopheles cruzii, is the species of mosquito that mainly located in southern coast of Brazil, is main vector of malaria, Plasmodium vivax.

References

Insects described in 1908
cruzii